Michael M. Ames,  (June 19, 1933 – February 20, 2006) was a Canadian academic and Professor of Anthropology of the department of  anthropology-sociology at the University of British Columbia.

Born in Vancouver, British Columbia, he received a B.A. in anthropology from the University of British Columbia in 1956. He received his Ph.D. in social anthropology from Harvard University in 1961. From 1962 to 1964, he was an assistant professor of sociology at McMaster University. He started at the University of British Columbia as assistant professor in 1964 and became a full professor in 1970.

From 1974 to 1997, he was director of the Museum of Anthropology at the University of British Columbia. From 2002 to 2004, he was also the acting director.

In 1998, he was made a Member of the Order of Canada. He was elected a Fellow of the Royal Society of Canada in 1979 and made a Fellow of the Society for Applied Anthropology in 1996.

References
 

1933 births
2006 deaths
Canadian anthropologists
Harvard Graduate School of Arts and Sciences alumni
Fellows of the Royal Society of Canada
Academic staff of McMaster University
Members of the Order of Canada
People from Vancouver
University of British Columbia alumni
Academic staff of the University of British Columbia
20th-century anthropologists